The 2013 Save Cup was a professional tennis tournament played on outdoor clay courts. It was the eleventh edition of the tournament which was part of the 2013 ITF Women's Circuit, offering a total of $50,000 in prize money. It took place in Mestre, Italy, on 2–8 September 2013.

WTA entrants

Seeds 

 1 Rankings as of 26 August 2013

Other entrants 
The following players received wildcards into the singles main draw:
  Martina Caregaro
  Deborah Chiesa
  Yuliana Lizarazo
  Anna Remondina

The following players received entry from the qualifying draw:
  Ágnes Bukta
  Nastja Kolar
  Zuzana Luknárová
  Despina Papamichail

Champions

Singles 

  Claire Feuerstein def.  Nastja Kolar 6–1, 7–6(7–2)

Doubles 

  Laura Thorpe /  Stephanie Vogt def.  Petra Krejsová /  Tereza Smitková 7–6(7–5), 7–5

External links 
 Official website 
 2013 Save Cup at ITFtennis.com

2013
2013 ITF Women's Circuit
2013 in Italian tennis
September 2013 sports events in Italy